Sir Stephen Herbert Gatty (1849-1922) was the Chief Justice of Gibraltar from 16 January 1895 to 1905. He was formerly a judge of the Supreme Court of the Straits Settlements.  On December 19, 1904, he was named a Knight Bachelor.

Personal life
Gatty was the son of Alfred Gatty and Margaret Gatty. He married firstly Alice Georgina Rawlinson (1849-1894) on August 29, 1876; they had no issue. Gatty then married Katharine Morrison (1869-1949), daughter of Alfred Morrison, on February 21, 1905. Their children were Hester Gatty (1906-1973), wife of Siegfried Sassoon, Oliver Gatty (1907-1940) and Richard Gatty (1909-1975).

References 

Chief justices of Gibraltar
Knights Bachelor
Year of birth uncertain
1922 deaths
1849 births
20th-century Gibraltarian judges
19th-century Gibraltarian judges
Straits Settlements judges